Guo Jing, Kwok Ching or Kuo Ching may refer to:

Guo Jing (郭靖), a fictional character from Jin Yong's Condor Trilogy
Guo Jing (activist), Chinese women's rights activist, book author, social worker
Guo Jing (footballer), Chinese footballer
Claire Kuo (郭靜), Taiwanese singer